Viscount  was a Japanese politician, diplomat, cabinet minister, and second Japanese Resident-General of Korea.

Biography
Sone was born in Nagato Province in Chōshū Domain (present-day Yamaguchi prefecture, his adopted father was a samurai from Hagi. He fought on the imperial side in the Boshin War.

After the Meiji Restoration, Sone was sent to France for studies, and on his return to Japan served in the War Ministry. Later, he served as director of the Cabinet Gazette Bureau, Secretary of the Cabinet Legislation Bureau and other posts, in 1890 he became the first Chief Secretary of the House of Representatives of the first session of the Diet of Japan.

Sone was elected to the House of Representatives in the 1892 Japanese general election, and served as Vice-Speaker of the House in the same year. In 1893, he became Japanese ambassador to France and negotiated the revision of the unequal treaties between France and Japan.

He served successively in a number of cabinet posts: Minister of Justice in the third Itō administration, Agriculture and Commerce Minister in the second Yamagata administration, Finance Minister in the first Katsura administration and other posts.

During the Russo-Japanese War with the help of Takahashi Korekiyo and others, he secured the foreign loans necessary to finance the expenses of the war. In 1900, Emperor Meiji nominated him to the House of Peers. In 1902, he was made a baron (danshaku) under the kazoku peerage system. He became a Privy Councillor in 1906, and elevated in status to viscount (shishaku) the following year.

Sone was appointed as Vice Resident-General of the Japanese administration in Korea in 1907, and Resident-General of Korea in 1909, replacing Itō Hirobumi. One of his major actions in Korea was to install a peninsula-wide telephone network, linking government offices, police stations and military installations throughout Korea. Sone was opposed to the Japanese annexation of Korea, but was forced to resign from his post in May 1910 due to illness and died a few months later.

References
 Beasley, W.G. Japanese Imperialism 1894-1945. Oxford University Press. 
 Duus, Peter. The Abacus and the Sword: The Japanese Penetration of Korea, 1895-1910 (Twentieth-Century Japan - the Emergence of a World Power. University of California Press (1998). .
 Keane, Donald. Emperor Of Japan: Meiji And His World, 1852-1912. Columbia University Press (2005). 

 Sims, Richard. French Policy Towards the Bakufu and Meiji Japan 1854-1894. RoutledgeCurzon (1998).

External links

National Diet Library Bio and Photo

Notes

|-

1849 births
1910 deaths
Members of the House of Peers (Japan)
Japanese Residents-General of Korea
Kazoku
People of the Boshin War
Japanese people of the Russo-Japanese War
People of Meiji-period Japan
People from Yamaguchi Prefecture
People from Chōshū domain
Government ministers of Japan
Ambassadors of Japan to France
Politicians from Yamaguchi Prefecture
Foreign ministers of Japan